Jennifer Murray (born June 1940 in Providence, Rhode Island) is a pilot. In 2000 she circumnavigated the globe in a Robinson R44 helicopter, traveling 36,000 miles in 97 days, earning her the Guinness World Record for the first helicopter circumnavigation by a woman.

Fastest circumnavigation 

In August 1997, Murray became the first woman to fly a helicopter around the world, when she co-piloted her Robinson R44 with Quentin Smith on the eastward circumnavigation.  The 97-day flight was also an eastbound speed record for a piston-powered helicopter.  The flight departed from Denham, UK, on 10 May 1997, and her stopover at Oakland Airport, Ca., USA on 20 July is commemorated at the Oakland Aviation Museum. On 6 September 2000, Murray became the first woman to make a solo flight around the world in a helicopter and the first person to do so without autopilot.

Pole to pole 
In 2007, Murray and co-pilot Colin Bodill became the first to land a helicopter on both North and South Poles, their second attempt.  Their first, in 2003, ended in a near fatal crash in Antarctica, after Murray had just become the first woman to fly a helicopter to the South Pole.

RacingThePlanet Nepal 
At 71, Jennifer was an entrant for RacingThePlanet Nepal, a 250 km Ultramarathon starting on 20 November 2011. She withdrew after stage two.

Family
She is the granddaughter of Sir William Mather, the British industrialist who was chairman of Mather & Platt.

She married prominent Hong Kong businessman Simon Murray in 1966.

Awards and honours 
 Rhode Island Aviation Hall of Fame Inductee 2005
 The Gambia issued a postage stamp in her honour in 2004
 Royal Aero Club - 1997 Silver Medal, 2000 Britannia Trophy
 Brabazon Cup
 Harmon Trophy
 Inducted in Forest of Friendship

References

External links
Interview and biography on Polar First site

English aviators
Harmon Trophy winners
1940 births
Living people
Britannia Trophy winners
Helicopter pilots
British women aviators
Rotorcraft flight record holders
British aviation record holders
British women aviation record holders